Aadma is a village in Hiiumaa Parish, Hiiu County in northwestern Estonia.

Aadma has village status since 1939. Before there existed Aadma Manor.

References

Villages in Hiiu County
Kreis Wiek